Alexander, Count von Hochberg-Fürstenstein, Prince von Pless or Aleksander Pszczyński (1 February 1905 – 22 February 1984) was a German aristocrat and polish military officer (2nd Lieutenant). Personal security guard for Prime Minister of Poland general Wladyslaw Sikorski. Awarded Monte Cassino Commemorative Cross and Cross of Merit with Swords for his service in Polish Army. In 1984, he briefly served as the head of the Hochberg von Pless princely family.

Biography
He was born 1 February 1905 in London, to Hans Heinrich XV, 3rd Prince von Pleß and his first wife Daisy, Princess of Pless. As an heir of once mighty Silesian ducal family of Dukes von Pless, Alexander (officially styled Alexander Friedrich Wilhelm Georg Konrad Ernst Maximilian Graf von Hochberg, baron zu Fürstenstein, 5th Fürst von Pless) had been a Polish citizen when Upper Silesia and Pless became part of Poland in 1921. Due to fiscal problems and indebtedness his estate was partly taken the Polish State (65% of the family's assets). Following his father's death in 1938 he emigrated to Paris, where he later joined the Polish Army in the West in the latter stages of the war. He served with distinction in North Africa and in Italy.

After the war he settled in Pollensa on the Spanish island of Majorca, where he died on 22 February 1984. The von Pless line of his family is now headed by his nephew Bolko Graf von Hochberg, 6th Fürst von Pless (b. Munich 3 Apr 1936).

References

Ancestry 

1905 births
1984 deaths
Polish Army officers
Silesian nobility